Qolamhossein Bigjekhani, also  Qolam-Hossein Bigjeh-Khani, (1918 – April 13, 1987) was an Iranian musician and tar player. He was born in Tabriz.

His art of tar playing is characterized by:

 extreme transparency and a detailed approach to moulding the musical phrases
 fast speed in fingering and plucking
 cultivated taste in balancing avazes and zarbis
 even tremolos and both hand vibrations
 fine sound-making even from low quality instruments
 using Azerbaijani zarbis in his performances
 using dayereh as an accompanying instrument
 fast plucking and various systems of plucking

He left a number of recordings, mostly of Persian Dastgah music. He collaborated mainly with his old friend and Dayereh player M. Farnam. They also played together at the Shiraz Festival of Arts in front of Empress Farah. He also accompanied Mohammad-Reza Shajarian (most notably on a 40 minute improvisation in Homayoon mode).

References
Haghighat, A., Honarmandan e Irani az Aghaz ta Emrooz, Koomesh Publication, 2004, (in Persian)

 Mahoor Institute's A Century of Tar

1918 births
1987 deaths
Iranian tar players
People from Tabriz